The 1976–77 Cypriot Cup was the 35th edition of the Cypriot Cup. A total of 42 clubs entered the competition. It began on 15 December 1976 with the preliminary round and concluded on 12 June 1977 with the final which was held at GSP Stadium. Olympiakos Nicosia won their 1st Cypriot Cup trophy after beating Alki Larnaca 2–0 in the final.

Format 
In the 1976–77 Cypriot Cup, participated all the teams of the Cypriot First Division, the Cypriot Second Division and the Cypriot Third Division.

The competition consisted of six knock-out rounds. In all rounds each tie was played as a single leg and was held at the home ground of the one of the two teams, according to the draw results. Each tie winner was qualifying to the next round. If a match was drawn, extra time was following. If extra time was drawn, there was a replay at the ground of the team who were away for the first game. If the rematch was also drawn, then extra time was following and if the match remained drawn after extra time the winner was decided by penalty shoot-out.

The cup winner secured a place in the 1977–78 European Cup Winners' Cup.

Preliminary round 
In the preliminary round participated 8 teams of 1976–77 Cypriot First Division, 7 teams of 1976–77 Cypriot Second Division and 5 teams of 1976–77 Cypriot Third Division. The teams of each division that participated in the preliminary round were decided by drawing. Then, the 8 teams of first division and 2 teams of the second division were the first group and the rest 5 teams of second division and the five teams of third division were the second group. Each team from the first group was drawn with a team of the second group.

First round 
8 clubs from the 1976–77 Cypriot First Division, 7 clubs from the 1976–77 Cypriot Second Division and 7 clubs from the 1976–77 Cypriot Third Division were added.

Second round

Quarter-finals

Semi-finals

Final

Sources

Bibliography

See also 
 Cypriot Cup
 1976–77 Cypriot First Division

Cypriot Cup seasons
1976–77 domestic association football cups
1976–77 in Cypriot football